In molecular biology, the Hepatitis A virus cis-acting replication element (CRE) is an RNA element which is found in the coding region of the RNA-dependent RNA polymerase in Hepatitis A virus (HAV). It is larger than the CREs found in related Picornavirus species, but is thought to be functionally similar. It is thought to be involved in uridylylation of VPg.

See also
 Hepatitis C virus cis-acting replication element

References

Hepatitis A